National Batakari Day (or simply Batakari Day) is a national day of celebration across Ghana, held on the first Friday of every month. Though not mandatory, everybody living in Ghana is expected to wear the Batakari smock to their various workplaces or schools. First declared on September 4, 2015, by the Ministry of Tourism, the day is meant to expose the culture of northerners as part of SADA's comprehensive development agenda for Ghana's three most deprived regions.

See also
Batakari Festival
World Damba Festival
National Sanitation Day

References

National days
Public holidays in Ghana